Aetholopus halmaheirae is a species of beetle in the family Cerambycidae. It was described by Stephan von Breuning in 1982. It is known from Moluccas.

References

Xylorhizini
Beetles described in 1982